The Rockville City Police Department (RCPD) is a U.S. law enforcement agency responsible for patrolling the city of Rockville, the third largest city in the U.S. state of Maryland. The RCPD patrols the city in cooperation with the Montgomery County Police Department (MCPD).  The agency serves a jurisdiction consisting of over 65,000 people and has been a CALEA-accredited agency since 1994. According to the RCPD, its mission is to protect and promote community safety, ensure the safe and orderly movement of traffic, and seek solutions to any problem that creates fear or threatens the quality of life in its jurisdiction.

History

1960s
In 1963, the RCPD began the use of radar to enforce speed limit compliance.

In 1968, the RCPD hired its first black policeman, Richard "Gene" Eugene Dyson.

1970s
In 1972, the RCPD only had 9 policemen.

In 1976, the RCPD and the Montgomery County P.D. formed a burglary prevention unit to help deter and investigate burglaries in the city.

In June 1976, Dennis Dempsey became the RCPD's first captain.

1980s
Until 1986, Walter Kent Atwell was the chief of the RCPD.

Charles Wall, a former New Jersey police chief, was chief of the Department from approximately 1975 to 1979.  Chief Wall later became chief of the Virginia Beach Police Department.  A Burglary Prevention Unit, composed of RCPD patrol officers and Montgomery County Police detectives, was created under Chief Wall.
Jared Stout, a former Fairfax County Police media director, was chief from 1979 through 1989.  Under Chief Stout, relations were formalized to allow Rockville City officers to respond to 911 calls.  Chief Stout was later chief of the Friendswood (TX) Police Department.

On March 20, 1989, former Granby Police Department officer Terrance N. "Terry" Treschuk joined the department as its chief of police.

1990s
On March 26, 1994, the RPCD was accredited by the Commission on Accreditation for Law Enforcement Agencies (CALEA).

In 1996, the RCPD was awarded the Excellence in Community Policing Award by the National League of Cities.

In 1998, the City of Rockville annexed 900 acres of land, increasing the RCPD's jurisdiction by the same.

In 1999, the RCPD had 45 sworn policemen and 18 unsworn civilian employees.

In 1999, the RCPD's honor guard participated in the year's Memorial Day parade.

2000s
In late November 2000, the RCPD made four arrests.

In 2000, the RCPD had 45 sworn policemen and 18 unsworn civilian employees.

In 2001, the RCPD's chief of police was Terrance N. "Terry" Treschuk.

In 2001, the RCPD had 50 sworn policemen and 20 unsworn civilian employees.

In 2002, the RCPD had 50 sworn policemen and 20 unsworn civilian employees.

In 2003, the RCPD had 50 sworn policemen and 20 unsworn civilian employees.

2010s
In 2011, the RCPD began the use of license plate-reading cameras on their cars.

In 2012, the RCPD transitioned to an electronic, computerized method of issuing traffic citations.

In 2012, the RCPD moved to a new headquarters building.

In June 2013, the RCPD had 57 sworn policemen on duty and 36 unsworn civilian employees for a total of 93 members.

In June 2016, the RCPD's chief Terrance N. "Terry" Treschuk retired. He had held the office since 1989 and was superseded by acting RCPD chief Robert J. "Bob" Rappoport.

In 2016, the RCPD made 678 arrests, gave 95 drunk driving citations, issued 13,603 parking tickets, and gave 8,996 traffic warnings.

For 2016, the RCPD's budget was 12,181,400$.

In 2017, the RCPD's policemen began wearing body cameras.

Former Hagerstown police chief Victor Brito became the chief of the RCPD in June 2018.

Organization
The current chief of police is Victor Brito, since mid-2018. The RCPD is divided into three bureaus:
Field Services Bureau
Special Operations Bureau
Administrative Services Bureau

Falling under the Office of the Chief, the RCPD also has the following sections:
Public relations
Professional standards (equivalent to an internal affairs in other agencies)
Inspection services
Police chaplain

The RCPD's headquarters building is located at 2 West Montgomery Avenue in Rockville, Maryland.

List of chiefs

Uniforms
RCPD uniforms are dark blue with a light blue stripe running down the side of each pant leg. RCPD officers who act as K-9 handlers wear dark blue BDUs. The Maryland state coat of arms is worn on the collars, except for high ranking officers like the chief, who wear rank insignia there instead.

Ranks

Historical ranks
In the 1970s, the RCPD had a captain rank. However, it no longer does, having replaced the rank with major.

Awards and decorations

Fleet
The RCPD uses the sixth-generation Ford Taurus Police Interceptor Sedan and second-generation Dodge Charger as its primary patrol cars; the RCPD also uses the second-generation Ford Explorer Police Interceptor Utility. The RCPD also uses motorcycles.

Liveries
The RCPD's patrol cars are painted grey with their liveries consisting of black and blue stripes on the sides with the words "ROCKVILLE POLICE" inscribed near the hood and on the front doors, with the Rockville city seal emblazoned on the rear doors. Inscribed on both front fenders are the words "If You SEE Something, SAY Something", with the words "EMERGENCY 911" emblazoned on the rear quarter panels.

Past liveries
In the 1990s, the RCPD's patrol cars were for the most part white Chevrolet Luminas and first-generation Ford Crown Victorias with a single blue stripe on the side running the entire length of the car from front to back. The Rockville city seal was emblazoned on both of the front doors, with the department's 10-digit phone number, "301-340-7300", inscribed on the front fenders, with the words "ROCKVILLE CITY POLICE" pasted on the rear quarter panels.

In the early mid-2000s the RCPD used Chevrolet Blazers and eighth-generation Chevrolet Impala 9C1s with a very similar livery design as the current one used presently in the 2010s, however the cars were painted white instead of grey and the motto on the front fenders were omitted. In the mid-2000s, the RCPD used Chevrolet Tahoes and Ford Crown Victoria Police Interceptors with the cars' paint schemes were changed from white to grey.

See also 

 Gaithersburg Police Department
 List of law enforcement agencies in Maryland
 Montgomery County Police Department

References

External links

Official website

Rockville, Maryland
Rockville